UC-67 may refer to:

 , a World War I German coastal minelaying submarine
 B-23 Dragon, an airplane with a United States military designation of "UC-67"